This is a list of the National Register of Historic Places listings in Jefferson County, Texas.

This is intended to be a complete list of properties and districts listed on the National Register of Historic Places in Jefferson County, Texas. There are one National Historic Landmark, three districts, and 20 other individual properties listed on the National Register in the county. Two individually listed properties are State Antiquities Landmarks including one along with ten other individual properties that are Recorded Texas Historic Landmarks. One district contains additional Recorded Texas Historic Landmarks.

Current listings

The locations of National Register properties and districts may be seen in a mapping service provided.

|}

See also

National Register of Historic Places listings in Texas
Recorded Texas Historic Landmarks in Jefferson County

References

External links

Registered Historic Places
Jefferson County
Buildings and structures in Jefferson County, Texas